The following lists events that happened during 1801 in Chile.

Incumbents
Royal Governors - Joaquín del Pino (-March 31), José de Santiago Concha Jiménez Lobatón (April 1-December), Francisco Tadeo Diez de Medina Vidanges (December-)

Events

Births
May 6 - José Joaquín Pérez, seventh president of Chile. (d. 1889)

References

1801 in the Captaincy General of Chile
Years of the 19th century in Chile
Years in the Captaincy General of Chile
1800s in the Captaincy General of Chile
Chile
Chile